The James Ross Island Volcanic Group is a stratigraphic unit of Cenozoic age distributed on James Ross Island and Vega Island of the James Ross Island group, the Tabarin and Trinity peninsulas of Graham Land and surrounding islands in the Prince Gustav and Antarctic sounds.

The volcanic group consists predominantly of alkali basalts with minor hawaiites, benmoreites and mugearites. They are interpreted to have been deposited by volcanic eruptions in an extensional back-arc setting after subduction had ceased along the western margin of the Antarctic Peninsula. K–Ar dating of these rocks suggest that they were erupted from about 7 million years ago up until about a few hundred thousand years ago. However, volcanic rocks as young as only a few thousand years old may exist on James Ross Island.

Rocks of the James Ross Island Volcanic Group comprise Surtseyan tuff cones and Strombolian cinder cones, as well as lava deltas and overlying subaerial lava flows. The dominating feature of the James Ross Island Volcanic Group is Mount Haddington, a massive shield volcano of Miocene-to-Pliocene age on James Ross Island.

Subdivisions
The James Ross Island Volcanic Group includes the following geological formations:

Cape Lachman Formation
Cape Well-met Formation
Dobson Dome Formation
Donnachie Cliffs Formation
Ekelof Point Formation
Forster Cliffs Formation
Hamilton Formation
Jefford Point Formation
Johnson Mesa Formation
Jonkers Mesa Formation
Keltie Head Formation
Kipling Mesa Formation
Lachman Crags Formation
Lookalike Peaks Formation
Palisade Nunatak Formation
Patalamon Mesa Formation
Sandwich Bluff Formation
Smellie Peak Formation
Stickle Ridge Formation
Sungold Hill Formation
Taylor Bluff Formation
Terrapin Hill Formation
Tumbledown Formation
Vertigo Cliffs Formation

Features
The James Ross Island Volcanic Group includes the following volcanic features:

Abel Nunatak
Andersson Island
Brown Bluff
Buttress Hill
Cain Nunatak
Carlson Island
Cockburn Island
Corry Island
Devil Island
Dobson Dome
Donnachie Cliff
Eagle Island
Scree Peak
Egg Island
False Island Point
Flett Buttress
Förster Cliffs
Gamma Hill
Cape Gordon
Mount Haddington
Jonassen Island
Keltie Head
Lachman Crags
Léal Bluff
Lockyer Island
Lomas Ridge
Mahogany Bluff
Cone Nunatak
Organpipe Nunatak
Palisade Nunatak
Paulet Island
Persson Island
Cape Purvis
Red Island
Rosamel Island
Sandwich Bluff
Seacatch Nunataks
Sentinel Buttress
Stark Point
Stickle Ridge
Sungold Hill
Tail Island
Terrapin Hill
Tongue Rocks
Virgin Hill
Vortex Island

See also
List of volcanoes in Antarctica

References

Volcanoes of Graham Land
Miocene volcanoes
Pliocene volcanoes
Pleistocene volcanoes
Volcanic groups
Geologic formations of Antarctica